Center line, centre line or centerline may refer to:

Sports
 Center line, marked in red on an ice hockey rink
 Centre line (football), a set of positions on an Australian rules football field
 Centerline, a line that separates the service courts in pickleball

Transportation
 Center line, a road surface marking
 Center line, a taxiway marking
 Center line, a runway marking 
 CenterLine (OCTA), failed light-rail project in Orange County, California, U.S.
 Centerline (nautical), the dividing line between port and starboard sides of a ship or boat
 Centreline, a bus service in Manchester, England, later rebranded Metroshuttle

Other uses
 Center Line, Michigan, a place in the United States
 Center Line High School
 Centre-Line Party, former name of the Australian Democrats political party
 Centerline, an engineering drawing symbol stylized by an overlapping C and L (℄)

See also

Central line (disambiguation)
℄, an engineering drawing symbol for centerline